Beck's cognitive triad, also known as the negative triad, is a cognitive-therapeutic view of the three key elements of a person's belief system present in depression. It was proposed by Aaron Beck in 1967. The triad forms part of his cognitive theory of depression and the concept is used as part of CBT, particularly in Beck's "Treatment of Negative Automatic Thoughts" (TNAT) approach.

The triad involves "automatic,  spontaneous and seemingly uncontrollable negative thoughts" about:
 The self
 The world or environment
 The future

Examples of this negative thinking include:
The self – "I'm worthless and ugly" or "I wish I was different"
The world – "No one values me" or "people ignore me all the time"
The future – "I'm hopeless because things will never change" or "things can only get worse!"

Beck's cognitive model of depression
From a cognitive perspective, depressive disorders are characterized by people's dysfunctional negative views of themselves, their life experience (and the world in general), and their future—the cognitive triad.

People with depression often view themselves as unlovable, helpless, doomed or deficient. They tend to attribute their unpleasant experiences to their presumed physical, mental, and/or moral deficits. They tend to feel excessively guilty, believing that they are worthless, blameworthy, and rejected by self and others. They may have a very difficult time viewing themselves as people who could ever succeed, be accepted, or feel good about themselves and this may lead to withdrawal and isolation, which further worsens the mood.

Cognitive distortions

Beck proposes that those with depression develop cognitive distortions, a type of cognitive bias sometimes also referred to as faulty or unhelpful thinking patterns. Beck referred to some of these biases as "automatic thoughts", suggesting they are not entirely under conscious control. People with depression will tend to quickly overlook their positive attributes and disqualify their accomplishments as being minor or meaningless. They may also misinterpret the care, good will, and concern of others as being based on pity or susceptible to being lost easily if those others knew the “real person" and this fuels further feelings of guilt. The main cognitive distortions according to Beck are summarised below:
 Arbitrary inference - drawing conclusions from insufficient or no evidence.
 Selective abstraction - drawing conclusions on the basis of just one of many elements of a situation. 
 Overgeneralisation - making sweeping conclusions based on a single event.
 Magnification - exaggerating the importance of an undesirable event.
 Minimisation - underplaying the significance of a positive event.
 Personalisation - attributing negative feelings of others to oneself.

Depressed people view their lives as devoid of pleasure or reward, presenting insuperable obstacles to achieving their important goals. This is often manifested as a lack of motivation and leads to the depressed person feeling further withdrawal and isolation as they may be seen as lazy by others.  Everything seems and feels “too hard to manage” and other people are seen as punishing (or potentially so). They believe that their troubles will continue indefinitely, and that the future will only bring further hardship, deprivation, and frustration. “Paralysis of the will” results from the depressed patients' pessimism and hopelessness. Expecting their efforts to end in failure, they are reluctant to commit themselves to growth-oriented goals, and their activity level drops. Believing that they cannot affect the outcome of various situations, they experience a desire to avoid such situations.

Suicidal wishes are seen as an extreme expression of the desire to escape from problems that appear to be uncontrollable, interminable, and unbearable.

Negative self-schemata 
Beck also believed that a depressed person will, often from childhood experiences, hold a negative self-schema. This schema may originate from negative early experiences, such as criticism, abuse or bullying. Beck suggests that people with negative self-schemata are liable to interpret information presented to them in a negative manner, leading to the cognitive distortions outlined above. The pessimistic explanatory style, which describes the way in which depressed or neurotic people react negatively to certain events, is an example of the effect of these schemata on self-image. This explanatory style involves blaming oneself for negative events outside of their control or the behaviour of others (personalisation), believing that such events will continue forever and letting these events significantly affect their emotional wellbeing.

Measuring aspects of the triad 
A number of instruments have been developed to attempt to measure negative cognition in the three areas of the triad. The Beck Depression Inventory (BDI) is a well-known questionnaire for scoring depression based on all three aspects of the triad. Other examples include the Beck Hopelessness Scale for measuring thoughts about the future and the Rosenberg Self-Esteem Scale for measuring views of the self. The Cognitive Triad Inventory (CTI) was developed by Beckham et al. to attempt to systematically measure the three aspects of Beck's triad. The CTI aims to quantify the relationship between "therapist behaviour in a single treatment session to changes in the cognitive triad" and "patterns of changes to the triad to changes in overall depressive mood". This inventory has since been adapted for use with children and adolescents in the CTI-C, developed by Kaslow et al.

See also
 Pessimistic explanatory style
 Cognitive therapy
 Cognitive behavioral therapy
 Self-concept
 Cognitive bias
 Automatic negative thoughts
 Attentional bias

References

Depression (mood)
3 (number)